RNC may refer to:

Technology and sciences
Radio Network Controller, a governing element of a mobile phone network
Ribosome-nascent chain complex, in biology
Romanian National R&D Computer Network, registry for the .ro top-level domain
 file extension for Relax NG files in compact syntax
Raster Navigational Charts (NOAA), a raster file format for nautical charts

Organisations
Royal Newfoundland Constabulary, a police force in Newfoundland and Labrador, Canada
Russia-NATO Council for cooperation between Russia and NATO military alliance

Politics
Republican National Committee, the principal campaign and fund-raising organization affiliated with the United States Republican Party
Republican National Convention, the nominating convention for the United States Republican Party
Rwanda National Congress, a political movement created by prominent Rwandan dissidents

Other
Riverside National Cemetery, a cemetery in Riverside, California for the interment of United States military personnel
Royal National College for the Blind, a college in Hereford, UK
Royal Niger Company, a mercantile company chartered by the British government in the nineteenth century
Rear naked choke, a martial arts move
NC (complexity), or RNC, a randomized complexity class in computational complexity theory
Nishinippon Broadcasting, a Japanese commercial broadcaster